The following is a list of members of the New World Order (nWo), a professional wrestling stable in World Championship Wrestling (WCW), World Wrestling Federation/Entertainment (WWF/WWE) and New Japan Pro-Wrestling (NJPW).

There were a total of 62 members of the group in its existence.

Incarnations and members

Timeline

WCW

NJPW

WWF/WWE

Celebrities

Sub-groups

References 

 
World Championship Wrestling teams and stables
WWE teams and stables
Sports organizations established in 1996
Professional wrestling-related lists